Arion is a Romanian surname with roots in Greece. Notable persons with that surname include:

 Anton I. Arion (1824–1897), Romanian politician
 Bryan Arion, Mexican actor and model
 Constantin C. Arion (1855–1923), Romanian politician
 Frank Martinus Arion (1936–2015), Curaçaoan poet, novelist, and language advocate
 George Arion (born 1946), Romanian crime writer
 Mihail Arion, Romanian diplomat
 Ruth Arion (1912–1998), German-Israeli painter and enamel artist
 Spiros Arion (born 1940), Greek professional wrestler

Romanian-language surnames